F-X Project may refer to:

F-X (Japan), Japan Air Self-Defense Force's next generation main combat aircraft procurement program.
 F-X fighter program, a multistage program to purchase modern aircraft for the Republic of Korea Air Force.
 Project F-X2 (known as F-X before 2007), a purchase of fighter aircraft by the Brazilian Air Force.
 A program by the United States Air Force that led to the McDonnell Douglas F-15 Eagle

 F-X (Turkey), known shortly as MMU in Turkey, a stealth twinjet all-weather air superiority fighter in development by the Turkish Aerospace Industries